Rebecca Šramková (born 19 October 1996) is a Slovak tennis player. She has career-high WTA rankings of 111 in singles, achieved on 8 May 2017, and 364 in doubles, reached on 24 May 2021. On the ITF Women's Circuit, she has won ten singles titles and three doubles titles. Šramková won her biggest title to date at the 2016 Open de Biarritz, a $100k tournament, where she defeated Martina Trevisan in the final.

Junior career
On the ITF Junior Circuit, Šramková achieved her highest ranking of 200 on 14 July 2014. She did not win any titles in singles, but won one title in doubles.

Career highlights
Her debut in the main competitions of the ITF Circuit was in May 2012, when she advanced from qualifying at the $10k tournament in Velenje, Slovenia. In the second round, she lost to Slovenian Anja Prislanová. She won the premier single in this level of tennis in Vrnjačka Banja, Serbia. At the $10k event which took place in September 2013, she defeated Dunja Stamenković from Serbia in the final. She took the premiere trophy from the 2016 Open de Biarritz tournament with a maximum subsidy of $100,000. In the final, she defeated Martina Trevisan in three sets. This was her fifth title on the ITF Circuit.

She made her WTA Tour singles debut at the 2015 Nottingham Open. At the beginning of the grass-court qualifying competition, she was eliminated by the second seeded Zhu Lin. 

She made her Grand Slam main-draw singles debut at the 2017 Australian Open by mastering the three-round qualifying rounds, where she dealt with Virginie Razzano in the decisive match. However, in the opening round of the singles tournament, she lost to Chinese player Duan Yingying.

At the 2022 French Open on her debut at this major, she entered the main draw as a lucky loser after the withdrawal of Rebecca Peterson.

National representation
Šramková made her debut on the Slovak Fed Cup team in 2017, in Forlì, Italy, in a match of the World Group II against Italy, in which she won both singles against Sara Errani and Francesca Schiavone as a player outside the top 100. With the decision set, they were dying alongside Anna Karolína Schmiedlová during the opening set of doubles. The Slovak team won 3–2. By April 2020, she competed in five interstate matches with a record of 2–4 in singles and 1–2 in doubles (in total 3–6).

Performance timelines

Singles

ITF Circuit finals

Singles: 15 (10 titles, 5 runner–ups)

Doubles: 6 (4 titles, 2 runner–ups)

Notes

References

External links

 
 
 

1996 births
Living people
Tennis players from Bratislava
Slovak female tennis players
21st-century Slovak women